Una (or Unnatnagar) is a city and a municipality in Gir Somnath district of the Saurashtra region in the state of Gujarat, India.

Geography 
Una is located on the bank of Machchundri river. Kodinar is located on the west, Diu is on the south.
Una has the highest number of villages of all the Talukas in Gujarat state.

Demographics 

As per 2011 India census, Una had a population of 58,528. Males constitute 51% of the population and females 49%. In Una, 14% of the population is under 6 years of age.

Una has an average literacy rate of 67%, higher than the national average of 59.5%: Male literacy is 74%, and Female literacy is 59%.

Una is the biggest taluka in Gir Somnath District in number of villages.

Some villages are:
 Nathal, Amodra, Khapat, Chachakvad, Delwada, Nathej, Vyajpur, Rameshvar, Sultanpur, Gangada, Samter, Garaal, Motha, Sanakhada, Sanjvapar, Simar, Navabandar, Kajrad, Bhacha, Umej, Gundala, Kesariya, Kob, Tad, Paldi, Olwan, Vansoj, Untwada, Varsingpur, Simasi, Kansari, Kalapan, Gangada, Khatriwada, Anjar etc. Since the town is a purchase hub of so many surrounding villages, it has variety of things available which other towns may not.

Transportation 
Una is situated on the national highway No. 8 E. This highway connects Bhavnagar with Veraval.  It is also on NH 51.

The city is well connected to other major cities of Gujarat such as Ahmedabad, Vadodara, Surat, Rajkot, Jamnagar, Junagadh and Bhavnagar etc. and Mumbai by bus services operated by state-owned transport corporations and private services. Daily bus services available for Mumbai by state-owned transport corporations and private bus operators.
Good transportation service is available for Diu, as it is one of the famous and popular tourist place. Diu is the nearest city having air transportation. Diu is 15 km far away from Una.

Una is also connected with Veraval and Junagadh by train service.

Attractions 

 Tribhovandas Parekh Tower.
 Pauranik Talav (Ancient Lake) is in the center of Una
 Rawal Dam is also a nice place to visit in rainy season
 Machundari Dam is also a nice place to visit in rainy season
 Droneshwar is also a nice place to visit in rainy season
 Jamjir Waterfall at Jamvala (Gir) is very wonderful place to visit
 Diu is also a near place to visit
 Ahmedpur Mandvi Beach it is also a near place to visit
 Gir National Park Home of Asiatic lions is a wildlife sanctuary near Una
 Tulshishyam is a religious place with hot springs which is 29 km away from Una

Temples 

 Ramvijay Hanuman Temple
 Mahakaleshwar Mahadev Temple
 Saniswar Mahadev Temple
 Modeshwar Mahadev Temple
 Kankeshwari Mata Temple
 Jalarambapa Temple
 Maa Shravan Khodiyar Mata Temple
 Gayatri Mata Temple
 Swaminarayan Temple
 Haveli una
 Tapovan Temple of Hanuman near Una
 Khodiyar Mata Temple at Amodra near Una
 Kapasi Bapu Ashram at Khapat near Una
 Ratneshwar Mahadev Temple at Gupt Prayag near Una
 Gupt Prayag Tirth at Delwada near Una
 Annapurna Ashram at Dhokadava near Una
 Droneshwar Mahadev Temple at Dron near Una
 Tulsishyam famous for Temple of Krishna, and with 3 Hot water springs there, situated in middle of Gir forest near Una
 Bhim Chas this is historical place situated in middle of Gir forest near Una
 Banej Temple of Mahadev in middle of Gir forest near Una
 Tapkeshwar Mahadev at Fareda in Gir near Una
 Pataleshwar Mahadev at babariya in Gir near Una
 Khodiyar Mata Temple at Chikhala nes in Gir near Una
 Hanuman Temple at Vajdi near Una
 Jagjivandas Bapu Ashram at Simar near Una
 Dudhnath Mahadev Temple at Motha near Una
 Amargiri Bapu Ashram at Garal near Una
 Gangnath Mahadev Temple at Garal near Una
 Sidhnath Mahadev Temple at Saamter near Una
 Rudreshwar Mahadev Temple at Arithiya near Una
 Sopatiyala Mahadev Temple at Vadaviyala near Una
 Rajalvejal Mataji Temple at Valaviyala near Sopatiyala Temple
 Rajput villa At vadaviyala

Medical centres 

The city has several hospitals and clinics.

 Community Health Center.
 Primary Health Centre Dhokadava.
 Shree Mehta Sarvajanik Hospital.
 Ramani Hospital Tower Chowk
 Bavadiya Hospital
 Manavdeep surgical hospital
 Natraj Hospital
 Sojitra Eye Hospital
 Dr J.V.Jungi's Gokul Hospital 
 Dr Dhaval J Shah Super speciality Homoeopathic Clinic

See also
Gujarat anti-Dalit Human Rights abuses

Notes and references

Cities and towns in Gir Somnath district